Euryglossina is a genus of bees belonging to the family Colletidae.

The species of this genus are found in Australia and New Zealand.

Species:

Euryglossina angulifacies 
Euryglossina argocephala 
Euryglossina atomaria 
Euryglossina atra 
Euryglossina aurantia 
Euryglossina bowenensis 
Euryglossina cardaleae 
Euryglossina clypearis 
Euryglossina clypearis 
Euryglossina cockerelli 
Euryglossina cornuta 
Euryglossina crococephala 
Euryglossina darwiniensis 
Euryglossina doddi 
Euryglossina doddi 
Euryglossina douglasi 
Euryglossina flaviventris 
Euryglossina flavolateralis 
Euryglossina fuscescens 
Euryglossina gigantica 
Euryglossina gigantocephala 
Euryglossina gilberti 
Euryglossina glauerti 
Euryglossina glenmorganensis 
Euryglossina globuliceps 
Euryglossina gracilis 
Euryglossina grandigena 
Euryglossina haemodonta 
Euryglossina healesvillensis 
Euryglossina hypochroma 
Euryglossina incompleta 
Euryglossina intermedia 
Euryglossina kellyi 
Euryglossina leucognatha 
Euryglossina leyburnensis 
Euryglossina lobiocula 
Euryglossina lynettae 
Euryglossina macrostoma 
Euryglossina megalocephala 
Euryglossina melanocephala 
Euryglossina melanognatha 
Euryglossina mellea 
Euryglossina micheneri 
Euryglossina minima 
Euryglossina moonbiensis 
Euryglossina mutica 
Euryglossina narifera 
Euryglossina neominima 
Euryglossina nigra 
Euryglossina nothula 
Euryglossina oenpelli 
Euryglossina perkinsi 
Euryglossina perpusilla 
Euryglossina philoxantha 
Euryglossina polita 
Euryglossina proctotrypoides 
Euryglossina proserpinensis 
Euryglossina pseudoatomaria 
Euryglossina psilosoma 
Euryglossina pulcherrima 
Euryglossina pulchra 
Euryglossina scapata 
Euryglossina semipurpurea 
Euryglossina storeyi 
Euryglossina stygica 
Euryglossina subnothula 
Euryglossina sulcata 
Euryglossina townsvillensis 
Euryglossina tuberculata 
Euryglossina walkeri 
Euryglossina weiri 
Euryglossina xanthocephala 
Euryglossina xanthogena

References

Colletidae